Henry O'Neill (1891–1961) was an American film actor.

Henry O'Neill may also refer to:

 Henry O'Neill (illustrator) (1798–1880),  Irish artist and antiquarian
 Henry O'Neill, 2nd Baron Dungannon, held title Baron Dungannon
 Sir Henry O'Neill, 3rd Baronet (c. 1674–1759) of the O'Neill baronets
 Sir Henry O'Neill, 1st Baronet (1625-c. 1680) of the O'Neill baronets
 Henry E. O'Neill (1848–1925), British explorer of Central Africa
 Henry MacShane O'Neill (died 1622), leader of the MacShane (not to be confused with MacShane's of Loughinsholin)
 Sir Henry Og MacShane, son of Henry MacShane O'Neill; see

See also
Harry O'Neill (disambiguation)
Henry O'Neil (disambiguation)
Henrique O'Neill, 1st Viscount of Santa Mónica (1823–1889), Portuguese writer and politician
Henry O'Neal, in Flirtation Walk